Voodoo Dollz is a 2008 American made-for-cable erotic comedy film directed by Fred Olen Ray (under the pseudonym name Nicholas Juan Medina).

Plot
At the Collin Sport School for Girls, Miss Anton catches Christina sleeping with her classmate Meg. As a result, Christina is sent to the Dunwich School for Girls to share a room with a student named Maria. Together they make friends with two more students, Jilly and Sandra. Miss Santana, the teacher, meets up with Miss Dambahla, a servant of Pakumba, and a caretaker named Jeff. Since Maria and Jeff are so much in love, she has to share her secret not only with Jeff, but also with the other girls. Maria's family is practicing voodoo, so she creates a voodoo doll for each of the girls in order to torture them. Just as Jilly is about to be sent over a cliff to her death by Maria's voodoo magic, Jeff arrives at the last second to save her.

Christina is later caught and tied to a cross (a la the Crucifixion of Jesus, according to Christian theology). The four women, Miss Santana, Miss Dambahla, Miss Anton and Maria, attempt to burn Christina at the stake. At that moment Jeff notices what's going on and comes charging in to Christina's rescue. He then sets the entire temple on fire, killing off the four evil women.

Cast
 Christine Nguyen as Christina
 Beverly Lynne as Jilly
 Monique Parent as Miss Dambahla
 Charlie Laine as Maria
 Nicole Sheridan as Sandra
 Alexandre Boisvert as Jeff
 Syren as Miss Santana
 Kitty Katzu as Meg
 Michelle Bauer as Miss Anton

Background
The film was produced by American Independent Productions and distributed by Retromedia Entertainment. It was broadcast several times in December 2008 on the premium channel Cinemax, and was available on demand. It was released on DVD on January 29, 2009.

The building, which serves as a set for the Dunwich School for Girls, was also used as a backdrop in Fred Olen Ray's 2006 film Ghost in a Teeny Bikini.

Reception
The film was given 2.5 points out of ten by Imdb.com.

References

External links
 
 

2008 television films
2008 films
Films directed by Fred Olen Ray
2000s sex comedy films
American sex comedy films
2000s English-language films
2000s American films